London was launched in 1832 by Wigrams for Money and H. L. Wigram to carry passengers to India. From 1840 she made two voyages from England carrying immigrants to New Zealand for the New Zealand Company. She also made two voyages transporting convicts from the United Kingdom to Tasmania. She then became a transport for several years before returning to trading between Newcastle and Spain. She ran into a barque in 1866 with the result that the barque's crew had to abandon their vessel. London was last listed in 1869.

Career
London first appeared in Lloyd's Register (LR) in 1832.

On 4 June 1832 London, Captain John Wimble, was due to sail to Madras and Calcutta. London sailed on 19 June, left Madras on 25 September, and arrived at Calcutta on 3 October. On this voyage London carried 300 tons of coal that she had loaded in London. While she was at Calcutta a portion of this cargo ignited spontaneously; the burning cargo was removed. London sustained some damage. This was the first of several voyages to Calcutta and return that London and Wimble made.

1st immigrant voyage to New Zealand (1840): London sailed under Captain Henry Shuttleworth for Wellington, leaving the Downs on 19 August 1840 and arriving at Wellington on 12 December. She arrived with 193 immigrants and 43 cabin passengers. She had left with some 228 immigrants and passengers. She sailed to Calcutta, and left there for London on 27 May 1841. She reached the Cape of Good Hope on 3 August and arrived back in London on 11 October.

2nd immigrant voyage to New Zealand (1842): London, Captain Joseph Thomas Attwood, master, left Gravesend in January 1842. She arrived in Wellington on 1 May 1842 with 182 immigrants.

1st convict voyage (1844): On 23 March 1844 London, under Captain John T. Attwood, brought 250 male convicts from Plymouth to Tasmania, arriving 9 July. She suffered no convict deaths on the voyage.

In 1847 London was sold for £5,900 to Teighe & Co. The owners were Thomas Dominick James Teighe (32/64), Charles Teighe (8/64), Robert Dyet (8/64), William Dix (8/64), and Frederick Leachey (8/64). LR did not catch up with the change of ownership and a change in destination until the 1851 issue.

2nd convict voyage (1850–1851): Captain J. Sceales sailed from Dublin on 20 December 1850. London arrived in Hobart on 10 March 1851. she had embarked 288 male convicts and suffered three convict deaths on the voyage.

New owners in 1858–1859 transferred Londons registry to Newcastle.

In late 1866 London, Ramsey, master, of Newcastle, was sailing to Newcastle from Cartagena, Spain, when she ran into Palmen, Hendrickson, master. Palmans crew abandoned Palman in a sinking state.

Fate
London was last listed in LR in 1869 (the online copy of LR for 1870 is missing pages), with data unchanged from 1866. She does not appear in the 1871 volume.

Citations and references
Citations

References
 

1832 ships
Age of Sail merchant ships of England
Migrant ships to New Zealand
Convict ships to Tasmania
Maritime incidents in December 1866